Petr Mach (born 6 May 1975) is a Czech economist and former Member of the European Parliament. He is the founder of the Party of Free Citizens which he led until 2017 when he was replaced by Tomáš Pajonk.

Early career
In 1997, Mach became chairman of the Young Conservatives, the youth wing of the Civic Democratic Party (ODS). In 2003 he earned a PhD from the Department of Monetary Theory and Policy of the University of Economics, Prague.

Mach worked as an executive director of the Center for Economics and Politics in Prague from 1999 to 2009, and as an external economic adviser to Czech President Václav Klaus from 2003 to 2007, with whom he shares enthusiasm for the free market economy and euroscepticism. Since 1998 he has been the publisher and editor of the Laissez-Faire newsletter.

Party of Free Citizens

Mach left ODS at the end of 2007, and after the party moved to a position of support for the Treaty of Lisbon, on 4 December 2008, Mach decided to form a new party, founding the Party of Free Citizens in 2009. In September 2010, he addressed the UK Independence Party Annual Conference and praised Václav Klaus for his opposition to the Lisbon Treaty. He addressed the party's conference again in 2014, following their victory in the 2014 European elections in the UK.

Later career

In 2019, Mach was announced as a member of the Tricolour Citizens' Movement, and addressed their party conference in Brno in September 2019.

References

External links 

 Official website

21st-century Czech economists
Czech libertarians
Politicians from Prague
1975 births
Living people
MEPs for the Czech Republic 2014–2019
Tricolour Citizens' Movement politicians
Svobodní MEPs
Civic Democratic Party (Czech Republic) politicians
Prague University of Economics and Business alumni
Leaders of Svobodní
Young Conservatives (Czech Republic) politicians